{| border=1 align="right" cellpadding=2 cellspacing=0 style="margin: 0 0 1em 1em; background: #f9f9f9; border: 1px #aaa solid; border-collapse: collapse; font-size: 95%;"
|-
! bgcolor="#ccccff" style="padding:0 0 0 50px;" | Kabardino-Balkarian Republic, Russia
| width="50px" | 
|-
| colspan=2 align="center"|Capital: Nalchik
|-
| colspan=2 align="center"|As of 2013:
|-
| # of districts(районы)|| 10
|-
| # of cities/towns(города)|| 8
|-
| colspan=2 align="center"|As of 2002:
|-
| # of rural localities(сельские населённые пункты)|| 168
|-
| # of uninhabited rural localities(сельские населённые пункты без населения)||—
|-
| colspan=2 | 
|}
Cities and towns under republic's jurisdiction
Nalchik (Нальчик) (capital)
Baksan (Баксан)
Prokhladny (Прохладный)
Districts:
Baksansky (Баксанский)
Chegemsky (Чегемский)
Towns under the district's jurisdiction:
Chegem (Чегем)
Chereksky (Черекский)
Elbrussky (Эльбрусский)
Towns under the district's jurisdiction:
Tyrnyauz (Тырныауз)
Leskensky (Лескенский)
Maysky (Майский)
Towns under the district's jurisdiction:
Maysky (Майский)
Prokhladnensky (Прохладненский)
Tersky (Терский)
Towns under the district's jurisdiction:
Terek (Терек)
Urvansky (Урванский)
Towns under the district's jurisdiction:
Nartkala (Нарткала)
Zolsky (Зольский)

References

Kabardino-Balkaria
Kabardino-Balkaria